The 7th Air Command (Serbo-Croatian: 7. vazduhoplovna komanda/ 7.  ваздухопловна команда) was a joint unit of Yugoslav Air Force.

History
It was established by the order from June 27, 1959, per the "Drvar" reorganization plan of Yugoslav Air Force from the command of 37th Aviation Division with command at Rajlovac. In 1961 it suffered a changes in the organization.

By the new "Drvar 2" reorganization plan of Yugoslav Air Force, on May 2, 1964, 7th Air Command has been disbanded. Its units were attached to 1st Aviation Corps.
The commanders of Air command was Svetozar Radojević.

Organization

1959-1961
7th Air Command
207th Signal Battalion
Liaison Squadron of 7th Air Command
Light Combat Aviation Squadron of 7th Air Command
7th Air Reconnaissance Regiment
103rd Reconnaissance Aviation Regiment (1960)
399th Air Base

1961-1964
7th Air Command
463rd Light Combat Aviation Squadron
892nd Liaison Aviation Squadron
7th Air Reconnaissance Regiment
103rd Reconnaissance Aviation Regiment
399th Air Base

Headquarters
Rajlovac

Commanding officers 
Colonel Svetozar Radojević

References 
Notes and citations

Bibliography

Air Commands of Yugoslav Air Force
Military units and formations established in 1959